Vanzosaura multiscutata is a species of lizard in the family Gymnophthalmidae. It is endemic to Brazil.

References

Vanzosaura
Reptiles of Brazil
Endemic fauna of Brazil
Reptiles described in 1933
Taxa named by Afrânio Pompílio Gastos do Amaral